Auroran may refer to:
 a person who lives in or comes from one of the many geographical locations throughout the world named Aurora
 a fictional empire in the Escape Velocity Nova computer game
 a type of daedra in The Elder Scrolls computer game series.